Divico was a Celtic king and the leader of the Helvetian tribe of the Tigurini. During the Cimbrian War, in which the Cimbri and Teutons invaded the Roman Republic, he led the Tigurini across the Rhine to invade Gaul in 109 BC. He defeated a Roman army near present-day Agen on the Garonne river at the Battle of Burdigala in 107 BC, killing its leaders Lucius Cassius Longinus, the Roman consul, and Lucius Calpurnius Piso Caesoninus. Eventually he led his people back to the tribes of the Helvetii, near present-day Switzerland where they settled in the Jura Mountains near Lac Leman. 49 years later, before the Battle of Bibracte, he led a delegation back to Gaul to negotiate for a safe passage for his tribe through the Roman region of Provence. The request was denied by Caesar who wanted revenge for a relative who had been killed in the battle near Agen in 107 BC.

He is not to be confused with the military and religious leader of another gaulish tribe, Diviciacus of the Aedui.

See also 
 Campaign history of the Roman military
 Helvetii

Notes 

2nd-century BC births
1st-century BC deaths
2nd-century BC monarchs
1st-century BC monarchs
Barbarian people of the Gallic Wars
Celtic warriors
Gaulish rulers
Helvetii
People of the Cimbrian War